Linda Züblin (born 21 March 1986) is a female heptathlete from Switzerland, who competed for her native country at the 2008 Summer Olympics.

Achievements

External links
 
 

1986 births
Living people
Swiss heptathletes
Athletes (track and field) at the 2008 Summer Olympics
Olympic athletes of Switzerland